Solidago squarrosa, commonly known as stout goldenrod, is a North American species of goldenrod in the family Asteraceae. It is native to Canada (Ontario, Québec, and New Brunswick) and the eastern United States (from Maine west to Indiana and south as far as Tennessee and the Carolinas).

Solidago squarrosa is  a perennial herb up to 150 cm (5 feet) tall, with a branching underground caudex. Leaves are egg-shaped, up to 20 cm (8 inches) long near the base of the plant, shorter farther up the stem. One plant can produce as many as 200 small yellow flower heads in a narrow, elongate array at the top of the plant.

References

External links
Go Botany, New England Wildflower Society
Ontario Wildflowers
Flore Laurentienne,  Frère Marie-Victorin (1885-1944), Recensement des richesses végétales vasculaires naturelles de la vallée du fleuve Saint-Laurent  Recensement des richesses végétales vasculaires naturelles de la vallée du fleuve Saint-Laurent,  Solidago squarrosa Mühlenberg.  in French with photos

squarrosa
Flora of the Eastern United States
Flora of Canada
Plants described in 1813
Taxa named by Gotthilf Heinrich Ernst Muhlenberg